Madi Banja (born 1 January 1986), is a R&B/rap artist from Stockholm, Sweden, rapping in Swedish.

Born and raised in Serekunda, Gambia, Madi moved to Enskededalen, Stockholm when he was 13 years old where he met Grammis winning producer Vittorio Grasso. It took Madi many years later until he started with music. In 2014 he was featured on Ison & Fille's platinum selling single "Länge leve vi". In November 2014 Madi put out his debut single "Inga problem" and in November 2015 he released his debut EP Det var inte med meningen. The EP got nominated for two P3 Guld awards and one Grammis.

References

Swedish rappers
1986 births
Living people
Swedish-language singers